Sarena may refer to:

People
Sarena Lin (born 1971), Taiwanese-American businesswoman
Sarena Parmar, Canadian actress

Places
Šarena Mosque
Mosque of Atik Behram Bey, known as Šarena džamija
Svijet je lopta šarena